The 2023 Copa CONMEBOL Libertadores is the 64th edition of the CONMEBOL Libertadores (also referred to as the Copa Libertadores), South America's premier club football tournament organized by CONMEBOL.

The final will be played at the Maracanã Stadium in Rio de Janeiro, Brazil on 11 November 2023, as announced by CONMEBOL president Alejandro Domínguez on 8 March 2023.

The winners of the 2023 Copa Libertadores will earn the right to play against the winners of the 2023 Copa Sudamericana in the 2024 Recopa Sudamericana. They will also automatically qualify for the 2023 and 2025 FIFA Club World Cups and the 2024 Copa Libertadores group stage.

Flamengo are the defending champions.

Teams
The following 47 teams from the 10 CONMEBOL member associations qualified for the tournament:
Copa Libertadores champions
Copa Sudamericana champions
Brazil: 7 berths
Argentina: 6 berths
All other associations: 4 berths each

The entry stage is determined as follows:
Group stage: 28 teams
Copa Libertadores champions
Copa Sudamericana champions
Teams which qualified for berths 1–5 from Argentina and Brazil
Teams which qualified for berths 1–2 from all other associations
Second stage: 13 teams
Teams which qualified for berths 6–7 from Brazil
Team which qualified for berth 6 from Argentina
Teams which qualified for berths 3–4 from Chile and Colombia
Teams which qualified for berth 3 from all other associations
First stage: 6 teams
Teams which qualified for berth 4 from Bolivia, Ecuador, Paraguay, Peru, Uruguay and Venezuela

Notes

Schedule
The schedule of the competition is as follows:

Draws

The draw for the group stage will be held on 27 March 2023. Teams will also be seeded by their CONMEBOL Clubs ranking as of 9 December 2022 (shown in parentheses), taking into account the same three factors. For the group stage, the 32 qualified teams will be drawn into eight groups (Groups A–H) of four containing a team from each of the four pots.

Qualifying stages

First stage

Second stage

Third stage

Group stage

The following 32 teams will be involved in the group stage (CONMEBOL Clubs ranking as of 9 December 2022 shown in parentheses):

Pot 1
 Flamengo (3)
 River Plate (1)
 Palmeiras (2)
 Boca Juniors (4)
 Nacional (6)
 Athletico Paranaense (7)
 Independiente del Valle (12)
 Olimpia (14)

Pot 2
 Libertad (16)
 Atlético Nacional (17)
 Internacional (18)
 Barcelona (19)
 Racing (22)
 Corinthians (24)
 Colo-Colo (28)
 Fluminense (32)

Pot 3
 Bolívar (33)
 The Strongest (38)
 Melgar (44)
 Alianza Lima (52)
 Argentinos Juniors (55)
 Metropolitanos (97)
 Aucas (112)
 Monagas (133)

Pot 4
 Liverpool (165)
 Deportivo Pereira (205)
 Ñublense (230)
 Patronato (No rank)
 Atlético Mineiro (11)
 Sporting Cristal (35)
 Cerro Porteño (15)
 Independiente Medellín (54)

Notes

Statistics

Top scorers

{| class="wikitable" style="text-align:center; font-size:90%"
!Rank
!Player
!Team
!
!
!
!
!
!
!
!
!
!
!
!
!
!
!
!
!
!
!  
!Total
|-
!1
|align=left| Paulinho
|align=left| Atlético Mineiro
|bgcolor="silver" colspan=2 | || ||1||1||2|| || || || || || || || || || || || || 
!4
|-
!2
|align=left| Irven Ávila
|align=left| Sporting Cristal
|bgcolor="silver" colspan=2 | || ||2|| ||1|| || || || || || || || || || || || || 
!3
|-
!rowspan=8|3
|align=left| Ronie Carrillo
|align=left| El Nacional
||1|| ||1|| ||bgcolor="silver" colspan=15 |
!rowspan=8|2
|-
|align=left| Guilherme
|align=left| Fortaleza
|bgcolor="silver" colspan=2 | || ||1|| ||1||bgcolor="silver" colspan=13 |
|-
|align=left| Hulk
|align=left| Atlético Mineiro
|bgcolor="silver" colspan=2 | || ||1|| ||1|| || || || || || || || || || || || || 
|-
|align=left| Juan Martín Lucero
|align=left| Fortaleza
|bgcolor="silver" colspan=2 | || ||2|| || ||bgcolor="silver" colspan=13 |
|-
|align=left| Mathías Martínez
|align=left| Nacional
|| ||1||1|| ||bgcolor="silver" colspan=15 |
|-
|align=left| Jorge Ordóñez
|align=left| El Nacional
||2|| || || ||bgcolor="silver" colspan=15 |
|-
|align=left| Byron Palacios
|align=left| El Nacional
|| ||1||1|| ||bgcolor="silver" colspan=15 |
|-
|align=left| Luciano Pons
|align=left| Independiente Medellín
|bgcolor="silver" colspan=2 | || || || ||2|| || || || || || || || || || || || || 
|}

See also
2023 Copa Sudamericana

References

External links
CONMEBOL Libertadores 2023, CONMEBOL.com

 
2023
1
Copa Libertadores